Nevills may refer to:
Norman Nevills (1908-1949), American river-runner
 Sam Nevills ( - after 1953), Canadian football player

See also
 Nevil (disambiguation)
 Nevill (disambiguation)
 Neville (disambiguation)